Presbyornis is an extinct genus of anseriform bird. It contains two unequivocally accepted species; the well-known P. pervetus and the much lesser-known P. isoni. P. pervetus was approximately the size and shape of a goose, but with longer legs; P. isoni, known from a few bones, was much larger, more than swan-sized. Other fossils, more doubtfully assigned to this genus, are also known.

Fossils

The fossil record of P. pervetus includes many complete skeletons from Green River Formation sites (Early Eocene), suggesting that the birds nested in colonies and possibly were liable to succumb to botulism, similar to many colony-nesting waterfowl or shorebirds today. P. isoni is known from the Late Paleocene Aquia Formation (Maryland, 61-62 MYA) humerus (USNM 294116) and a fingerbone (USNM 294117) that were initially described, as well as from the humeri that were initially believed to be from Headonornis (BMNH PAL 3686, 5105, 6240). As these are Late Eocene or even Early Oligocene (BMNH PAL 5105, Bembridge Marls) in age, they possibly belong to a distinct taxon.

P. recurvirostris is a disputed species possibly synonymous with P. pervetus; it is known from a partial wing (KUVP 10105) found in Colton Formation Eocene sediments of the Wasatch Plateau near Ephraim, Utah. Undescribed fossils are also known from the Paleocene of Utah and possibly the Early Eocene of Mongolia. The coracoid still assigned to Headonornis may also belong into this genus.

Description

Presbyornis was one of the first anseriforms. Because of its long legs and neck, Presbyornis was initially mistaken for a flamingo, but it was reclassified as an anseriform when the duck-like anatomy of its skull and bill was found. Later, it was believed to represent a transitional stage between the anseriforms and the shorebirds, but it is now considered a member of an extinct group of anseriforms which was most closely related to modern screamers. Judging from numerous fossil findings, Presbyornis is presumed to have lived in colonies around shallow lakes. Its broad, flat bill was used to filter food (small plants and animals) from the water, in the manner of today's dabbling ducks.

Footnotes

References
  (2001): The Fossil Waterfowl (Aves: Anseriformes) from the Eocene of England. American Museum Novitates 3354: 1-15. PDF fulltext
  (2002): A New Presbyornithid Bird (Aves, Anseriformes) from the Late Cretaceous of Southern Mongolia. American Museum Novitates 3386: 1-11. PDF fulltext
 
  (1926): Fossil birds from the Green River Deposits of Eastern Utah. Annals of the Carnegie Museum 16: 391–402.

External links
 Reconstruction of Presbyornis at critters.pixel-shack.com

 
Bird genera
Paleocene birds
Eocene birds
Oligocene birds
Paleogene birds of North America
Fossil taxa described in 1926
Taxa named by Alexander Wetmore